Sarıcalı or Sarydzhaly may refer to:
Sarıcalı, Agdam, Azerbaijan
Sarıcalı, Aghjabadi, Azerbaijan
Sarıcalı, Jabrayil, Azerbaijan
In Tartar Rayon:
Sarıcalı, Tartar, Azerbaijan
Yuxarı Sarıcalı, Azerbaijan

See also
Sarıcalar (disambiguation)